This is a complete list of known Lechia Gdańsk players and their known competition statistics for the club since the clubs formation in 1945.

Information

This list also includes the players who played for Olimpia-Lechia Gdańsk and Lechia-Polonia Gdańsk due to these teams being created by mergers of Lechia Gdańsk and another team, and these teams replacing Lechia Gdańsk in the league. For the Olimpia-Lechia Gdańsk team, the club was a result of a merger between Lechia Gdańsk and Olimpia Poznań, the original Lechia Gdańsk team became known as Lechia Gdańsk II for the 1995–96 season, becoming the first team again the season after. Statistics for both the Olimpia-Lechia Gdańsk and Lechia Gdańsk II (for the 1995–96 season) are listed. The situation is slightly different with Lechia-Polonia Gdańsk who played from 1998 until 2002. This merger between Lechia Gdańsk and Polonia Gdańsk resulted in there being no Lechia Gdańsk team between 1998 and 2001, when the team reformed in the lowest divisions. For the 2001–02 season both Lechia-Polonia Gdańsk and the newly formed Lechia Gdańsk played in the leagues. Statistics for Lechia-Polonia Gdańsk from 1998 until 2002 are shown, as well as the original and current Lechia Gdańsk teams statistics since 2001. There are therefore two seasons in which two clubs count towards statistics for Lechia Gdańsk, 1995–1996 and 2001–2002. During the 1995–1996 season the original Lechia Gdańsk team was known as Lechia Gdańsk II, the league stats for the II team are being treated as normal II team stats and are included in the Other section.

There are 8 players where only the last name is known. Throughout the early years of Lechia's history the team did not always document players information as much as they do now, and news papers often only reported the players last names. Despite not knowing the full identity of these players they have still been included as they have still made appearances for Lechia Gdańsk.

Key

The table below identifies the sorting of the players stats.

Player statistics

The stats will be next updated after the end of the 2022–23 season and are correct as of 22 May 2022. This table will be updated at the end of each season, or before the end of the season for players who move to other clubs.

(Stats updated to 22 May 2022)

References

Lists of association football players by club
Lechia Gdańsk
Association football player non-biographical articles